Jacob Engel is an Israeli businessman, active in the mining sector, and CEO of Engelinvest Group.

In 1951, Engel migrated to Israel from Croatia. Engel was previously a property developer and speculator.

In 2010, Elenilto obtained a 25-year licence to develop Liberia's Western Cluster group of three mines, one of the largest iron ore deposits in Africa.

References

Israeli chief executives
Israeli Jews
Croatian Jews
Croatian expatriates in Israel
Living people
People named in the Panama Papers
Year of birth missing (living people)
Israeli billionaires